{{DISPLAYTITLE:C40H58}}
The molecular formula C40H58 (molar mass: 538.89 g/mol, exact mass: 538.4539 u) may refer to:

 Neurosporene
 β-Zeacarotene

Molecular formulas